Eldon Wade "Pokey" Reddick (born October 6, 1964) is a Canadian former professional ice hockey goaltender in the National Hockey League from 1986–87 to 1993–94.

Playing career
As a youth, Reddick played in the 1977 Quebec International Pee-Wee Hockey Tournament with a minor ice hockey team from Toronto.

Reddick spent most of his career in various minor leagues playing for various teams. His NHL-level experience included playing for the Winnipeg Jets, Edmonton Oilers, and Florida Panthers. He won a Stanley Cup Championship with the Oilers in 1990 as the backup goaltender to Bill Ranford, because of a season-ending injury to the Oilers regular goaltender Grant Fuhr. During his tenure with the Winnipeg Jets, he formed one half of the goaltending duo "Pokey and the Bandit" with Daniel Berthiaume.

Pokey Reddick holds the National Hockey League record for most games played by a goaltender without recording a shutout. Reddick played in 132 National Hockey League games over his career without recording a single shutout.

Reddick also holds the distinction of being the only goaltender at any level of professional hockey to go through a three-round playoff system undefeated. He achieved this feat with the Fort Wayne Komets in the IHL in 1992–93. Reddick had a 1.49 GAA through 12 postseason games, leading the Komets to the franchise's first title in 20 years.

Personal
Reddick received the nickname "Pokey" from his father as a result of his "slowpoke" movement throughout the house.

His younger brother, Stan "Smokey" Reddick, was also a goaltender who spent twelve years playing in the ECHL and Slovenia. His son, Bryce Reddick, is a defenseman active in the minor leagues and European hockey as of 2020. Pokey also has three other children: Jenna Reddick, Zoe Reddick, and Matthew Vorce.

Reddick was formerly an assistant coach for the Tri-City Storm of the USHL. He currently resides in Las Vegas, Nevada, and served as tournament director at the Las Vegas Ice Center through April 2014 and head coach of the Las Vegas Storm Midget U16 AAA hockey team through April 2013. He is also coaching the first high school hockey team in Nevada at Faith Lutheran Middle School & High School, which is playing in its inaugural season in 2018-2019.

Career statistics

Regular season and playoffs

Awards and honours

References

External links
 
Pokey Reddick on Goalies Archive

1964 births
Billings Bighorns players
Black Canadian ice hockey players
Black Nova Scotians
Brandon Wheat Kings players
Canadian ice hockey goaltenders
Cape Breton Oilers players
Cincinnati Cyclones (IHL) players
Edmonton Oilers players
Florida Panthers players
Fort Wayne Komets players
Frankfurt Lions players
Grand Rapids Griffins (IHL) players
Sportspeople from Halifax, Nova Scotia
Kansas City Blades players
Las Vegas Thunder players
Living people
Moncton Hawks players
Nanaimo Islanders players
New Westminster Bruins players
Phoenix Roadrunners (IHL) players
San Antonio Dragons players
Sherbrooke Canadiens players
Stanley Cup champions
Undrafted National Hockey League players
Winnipeg Jets (1979–1996) players
Ice hockey people from Nova Scotia
Canadian expatriate ice hockey players in Germany